Amt Golzow is an Amt ("collective municipality") in the district of Märkisch-Oderland, in Brandenburg, Germany. Its seat is in Golzow.

The Amt Golzow consists of the following municipalities:
Alt Tucheband
Bleyen-Genschmar
Golzow 
Küstriner Vorland
Zechin

Demography

References

Golzow
Märkisch-Oderland